Kristiina Elstelä (10 January 1943 – 26 June 2016) was a Finnish actress, who acted in many TV shows and movies. She also had a long career in theater and was a cabaret artist.

In 2006 Elstelä was one of the competitors in Dancing with the Stars television series. She and her partner Marko Keränen were ranked seconds, right after Tomi Metsäketo and Sanna Hirvaskari.

She was the daughter of actor Ossi Elstelä and actress Irja Elstelä.

Filmography

Films 
 Pekka & Pätkä ja tuplajättipotti (1985)
 Viimeinen keikka (1985)
 Pekka Puupää poliisina (1986)
 Onks' Viljoo näkyny? (1988)
 Pilkkuja ja pikkuhousuja (1992)
 Kummeli Kultakuume (1997)
 Kymmenen riivinrautaa (2002)
 Uuno Turhapuro – This Is My Life (2004)
 Ganes (2007)
 Sooloilua (2007)
 Myrsky (2008)

TV series 
 ÄWPK - Älywapaa palokunta (1984–1985)
 Pekka ja Pätkä (1986)
 Takaisin kotiin (1995)
 Uuno Turhapuro (1996)
 Akkaa päälle: Team Ahma (1996)
 Kun taivas repeää (1997)
 Kaverille ei jätetä: Leiwoset (1999)
 Taivas sinivalkoinen (2001)
 Sydän kierroksella (2006)
 Tanssii tähtien kanssa (2006)

Awards and nominations 
 1982 – Thalia Award
 1998 – Pro Finlandia
 2005 – Ida Aalberg Acting Prize
 2007 – Jussi Award: Best Supporting Actress (Sooloilua)

References

External links
 

1943 births
2016 deaths
Finnish stage actresses
Finnish television actresses
Actresses from Helsinki